Raja Adeel (born 2 October 1987) is an Indian-born cricketer, who plays for the Spanish cricket team. He made his first-class debut for the United Arab Emirates against Hong Kong in the 2015–17 ICC Intercontinental Cup tournament on 11 November 2015. In September 2019, he was named in Spain's Twenty20 International (T20I) squad for the 2019 Iberia Cup tournament. He made his Twenty20 International (T20I) debut for Spain, against Portugal, on 25 October 2019.

References

External links
 

1987 births
Living people
Emirati cricketers
Spanish cricketers
Spain Twenty20 International cricketers
Dual international cricketers
Cricketers from Gujarat
Indian emigrants to the United Arab Emirates
Indian expatriate sportspeople in the United Arab Emirates
Indian emigrants to Spain
Indian expatriate sportspeople in Spain
Indian cricketers